Andrzej Huszcza  (born 10 March 1957 in Krępa, Poland) is a Polish former international motorcycle speedway rider who was a reserve (did not ride) in the 1988 World Final in Vojens, Denmark.

Huszcza rode for Falubaz Zielona Góra for thirty years from 1975 until 2005. He then spent two seasons with PSŻ Poznań before finally retiring aged fifty.  Huszcza spent two seasons in the UK riding for the Hackney Hawks, Reading Racers and the Leicester Lions in the British League.

In 2008, he returned to ZKŻ Zielona Góra as coach.

Huszcza is the father of three daughters.

World Final Appearances

Individual World Championship
 1988 -  Vojens, Speedway Center - Reserve - did not ride.

World Pairs Championship
 1985 -  Rybnik, Rybnik Municipal Stadium (with Grzegorz Dzikowski) - 7th - 8pts (4)

World Team Cup
 1978 -  Landshut, Ellermühle Stadium (with Edward Jancarz / Zenon Plech / Marek Cieślak / Jerzy Rembas) - 3rd - 16+3pts (1)
 1980 -  Wrocław, Olympic Stadium (with Zenon Plech / Roman Jankowski / Edward Jancarz / Jerzy Rembas) - 3rd - 15pt (2)

European Championship
 2003 -  Slaný - 9th - 8pts
 2004 -  Holsted - 12th - 5pts

World (European) Under-21 Championship
 1977 -  Vojens, Speedway Center - 10th - 3pts

Polish Championship
 1982 -  Zielona Góra - Winner

References

External links

 www.hackneyhawks.co.uk

Polish speedway riders
1957 births
Living people
Hackney Hawks riders
Leicester Lions riders
Reading Racers riders
People from Zielona Góra County
Sportspeople from Lubusz Voivodeship